Miguel Ángel Rellán García (7 November 1942) is a Spanish actor. He was the first actor to win a Goya Award for Best Supporting Actor for Tata mía at the 1987 edition.

Filmography

Film

Television series

Theatre

References

External links
 
 

1942 births
Living people
People from Tétouan
Spanish male television actors
Spanish male stage actors
Spanish male film actors
Best Supporting Actor Goya Award winners
20th-century Spanish male actors
21st-century Spanish male actors